Chandos Lake is a lake in North Kawartha, Ontario, Canada.

The lake is in the shape of a reversed L, with three main bays: West Bay, connected to the main body of the lake by a long Narrows; South Bay, extending southwest and separated by a curved peninsula; and Gilmour Bay, a smaller, two-lobed bay on the southern tip of the lake, connected by Gilmour Bay Narrows.

Chandos Lake is in the Atlantic watershed; fed by springs, it drains from its north end into Flat Creek, which flows into Paudash  Lake, thence to the Crowe River, the Trent River, and Lake Ontario. Chandos is the largest lake in the Crowe River watershed. Chandos Lake measures 1,387 hectares and has a maximum depth of 48 metres.

Chandos Lake was originally called Mongosogan by the Mississauga Anishinabe, on whose traditional territory it lies. Although not one of the Kawartha Lakes proper, Chandos Lake is part of the Kawartha cottage country; the lake is lined with some 1,200 cottages. The lake features three marinas and a public beach. The towns of Apsley, Glen Alda, and Lasswade are located on or near the lake. County Roads 620 and 504 encircle the lake.

See also
List of lakes in Ontario

Notes

References
 National Resources Canada
 Chandos Lake Property Owners Association

Lakes of Peterborough County